

Prosauropods

Sauropods

See also

List of dinosaur-bearing rock formations

Footnotes

References
 Weishampel, David B.; Dodson, Peter; and Osmólska, Halszka (eds.): The Dinosauria, 2nd, Berkeley: University of California Press. 861 pp. .

Sauropodomorph tracks
Dinosaur trace fossils
Sauropodomorphs